Curaco Airport was an airstrip  north of Panguipulli, a city in the Los Ríos Region of Chile.

Google Earth Historical Imagery (8/28/2010) shows the runway outline with markings removed and plowed. The (12/27/2013) image shows crops planted, new fencelines crossing the area, and waterways moved. Current imagery (10/20/2016) shows additional fencelines and a new road crossing, with no trace of the former runway.

See also

Transport in Chile
List of airports in Chile

References

External links
 Airport record for Curaco Airport at Landings.com
OpenStreetmap - Curaco Airport

Defunct airports
Airports in Los Ríos Region